Leonel Fernando "Pipa" Gancedo (born 23 January 1971) is an Argentine former professional footballer who is currently player-manager of Andorran club FC Encamp.

Gancedo, a midfielder, played for River Plate for four years, winning five domestic titles, as well as the 1996 Copa Libertadores and the 1997 Supercopa Libertadores with the club. He later served as the club's sporting director.

He joined FC Encamp, aged 47, in September 2018.

Honours
River Plate
Primera División Argentina (5): 1996, 1997, 1999 (Apertura); 1997, 2000 (Clausura)
Copa Libertadores (1): 1996
Supercopa Libertadores (1): 1997

References

External links
 

1971 births
Living people
Sportspeople from Buenos Aires Province
Argentine footballers
Argentinos Juniors footballers
Club Atlético River Plate footballers
CA Osasuna players
Real Murcia players
Club Atlético Huracán footballers
América de Cali footballers
Club Atlético River Plate Puerto Rico players
Deportivo Morón footballers
Association football midfielders
La Liga players
Argentine expatriate sportspeople in Spain
Expatriate footballers in Spain
Argentine expatriate sportspeople in Puerto Rico
Expatriate footballers in Puerto Rico
Argentine expatriate sportspeople in Andorra
Expatriate footballers in Andorra
Expatriate football managers in Andorra
FC Encamp players
Argentine football managers
Association football player-managers